Below is a list of Dianthus species and cultivars which have gained the Royal Horticultural Society's Award of Garden Merit. This is an important group of more-or-less fragrant summer-flowering perennial garden plants, which can be divided into three main groups:-
Carnations (D. caryophyllus)
Pinks (D. plumarius)
Sweet Williams (D. barbatus)

Carnations can be further divided into hardy border types, which grow outside, and perpetual flowering types which are usually grown under glass to provide cut flowers and buttonholes all year round.

The list does not currently include any sweet william cultivars.

References

Dianthus
Dianthus